Orson Schofield (Old Mountain) Phelps (May 6, 1817 - April 14, 1905) was an early Adirondack guide from Keene Valley.  "He was not a great guide.  Indeed many did not consider him even a good guide." He became a local legend due to publicity by people such as writers Charles Dudley Warner and E. R. Wallace, and photographer Seneca Ray Stoddard.  Phelps named many of the Adirondack High Peaks, and cut the first trail up Mount Marcy.  Phelps Mountain is named in his honor.

Two streams also bear his name:
 Phelps Brook, draining the southern flank of Phelps Mountain and the western flank of Table Top Mountain.
 Phelps Brook in the hamlet of Keene Valley, by which he made his home at Phelps Falls.

References

Bibliography
 Healy, Bill. "The High Peaks of Essex: The Adirondack Mountains of Orson Schofield Phelps". Purple Mountain Press, 1992. Fleischmanns, NY.
 Wallace, E. R. "Descriptive guide to the Adirondacks, and handbook of travel to Saratoga Springs, Schroon Lake, lakes Luzerne, George and Champlain, the Ausable Chasm, the Thousand Islands, Massena Springs and Trenton Falls".  Forest and Stream Publishing Company, 1876.  New York.link

External links
 Phelps Falls

Adirondacks
1817 births
1905 deaths
People from Keene, New York